In the paint and coating industries, paint adhesion testing  is often used to determine if the paint or coating will adhere properly to the substrates to which they are applied. There are several different tests to measure the resistance of paints and coatings from substrates: cross-cut test, scrape adhesion,  pull-off test, and others.

Scrape Adhesion Test

The scrape adhesion test measures the determination of the adhesion of organic coatings when applied to smooth, flat panel surfaces. It is helpful in giving relative ratings for a number of coated panels showing significant differences in adhesion. The materials being tested are applied at uniform thickness to flat panels, mainly some sort of sheet metal. When the materials have dried the adhesion is determined by pressing panels under a rounded stylus that is loaded with increasing amounts of weight until the coating is removed from the substrate surface.

Pull-off test

The adhesion of a coating or several coated sample of any paint product is measured by assessing the minimum tensile stress needed to detach or rupture the coating perpendicular to the substrate. Unlike the other methods, this method maximizes the tensile stress, therefore results may not be comparable to the others. The test is done by securing loading fixtures (dollies) perpendicular to the surface of a coating with an adhesive. Then the testing apparatus is attached to the loading fixture and is then aligned to apply tension perpendicular to the test surface. The force that is applied gradually increases and is monitored until a plug of coating is detached, or a previously specified value is reached.

Cross-cut Test

The cross-cut test is a method for determining the resistance of paints and coatings to separation from substrates by utilizing a tool to cut a right angle lattice pattern into the coating, penetrating 
all the way to the substrate.

A quick pass/fail test can be accomplished through this method. When testing a multi-coat system, determination of the resistance to separation of different layers from one another can be accomplished.

There are two methods described in the ASTM Specification;

ASTM D 3359 Test Method A
An X-cut is made through the film with a carbide tip tool to the substrate.
Pressure-sensitive tape is applied over the cut.
Tape is smoothed into place by using a pencil eraser over the area of the incisions.
Tape is removed by pulling it off rapidly back over itself as close to an angle of 180°.
Adhesion is assessed on a 0 to 5 scale.

ASTM D 3359 Test Method B
A crosshatch pattern is made through the film to the substrate.
Detached flakes of coating are removed by brushing with a soft brush.
Pressure-sensitive tape is applied over the crosshatch cut.
Tape is smoothed into place by using a pencil eraser over the area of the incisions.
Tape is removed by pulling it off rapidly back over itself as close to an angle of 180°.
Adhesion is assessed on a 0 to 5 scale.
[0- Greater than 65% area removed & 5 is 0% area removed]

See also
 Painter and decorator

Notes

Coatings
Tests